Ṣāʿid al-Andalusī, in full Abū al-Qāsim Ṣāʿid ibn Abū al-Walīd Aḥmad ibn Abd al-Raḥmān ibn Muḥammad ibn Ṣāʿid ibn ʿUthmān al-Taghlibi al-Qūrtūbi (1029July 6, 1070 AD; 4206 Shawwal, 462 AH), was an Arab qadi of Toledo in Muslim Spain, who wrote on the  history of science, philosophy and thought. He was a mathematician and scientist with a special interest in astronomy and compiled a famous biographic encyclopedia of science that quickly became popular in the empire and the Islamic East.

Life
Ṣāʿid al-Andalusī was born in Almería in Al-Andalus during the Banu Dhiʼb-n-Nun dynasty and died in Toledo. His Arab origins came from the tribe of Taghlib and his family had fled Cordova to take refuge in Almería during the civil war. His grandfather had been qadi (judge) of Sidonia and his father was qadi of Toledo until his death in 1057 when Ṣāʿid succeeded him.

The early biographers Ibn Bashkuwāl, Ibn Umaira al-Dhabbi, Al-Safadi and Ahmed Mohammed al-Maqqari tell us Ṣāʿid's teachers in Toledo were Abū Muḥammad ibn Hazm,  Al-Fataḥ ibn al-Qāsim, and Abū Walīd al-Waqshi. He was educated in fiqh (law) first in Almería, then Córdoba, before graduating, it seems, in Toledo  in 1046, aged eighteen. Toledo was then a great centre of learning and Ṣāʿid studied fiqh (law), tafsir (Qu'ranic exegesis), Arabic language, and al-Adab al-'Arabī (Arabic literature). His teacher, Abū Isḥaq Ibrāhīm ibn Idrīs al-Tajibī, directed him towards mathematics and astronomy, in which he excelled. When on his appointment as qāḍi of Toledo by the governor Yaḥyā al-Qādir, he continued this work and produced several scholarly works that contributed to the Tables of Toledo.

He taught and directed astronomical research to a group of young scholars, precision-instrument-makers, astronomers and scientistsincluding the renowned Al-Zarqaliand encouraged them to invent. Their research contributed to the Tables of Toledo.

Works
Iṣlāh Ḥarakāt an-Najūn  on the correction of earlier astronomical tables;
Jawāmiʿ akhbār al‐umam min al‐Arab wa‐l Ajam ('Universal History of Nations – Arab and Non‐Arab')
Ṭabaqāt al-‘Umam, a classification of the sciences and of the nations (The only extant work), written in 1068 two years before his death.
Rectification of Planetary Motions and Exposition of Observers' Errors; An  astronomical treatise.
Maqālāt ahl al‐milal wa-l-nihal ('Doctrines of the Adherents of Sects and Schools'),
Kitāb al-Qāsī, 'Book of Minor'

Tabaqāt al-ʼUmam (Categories of Nations) 
The Ṭabaqāt al-ʼUmam (Tabaqāt) composed in 1068 is an early "history of science" that comprises biographies of the scientists and scientific achievements of eight nations. In the field of nations are the Indians, Persians, Chaldeans, Egyptians, Greeks, Byzantines, Arabs and Jews (in contrast to others not disposed, such as Norsemen, Chinese, Africans, Russians, Alains and Turks). Ṣāʿid offers an account of the individual contribution each nation makes to the various sciences of arithmetic, astronomy, and medicine, etc., and of the earliest scientists and philosophers, from the Greeks,Pythagoras, Socrates, Plato and Aristotleto the Roman and Christian scholars of the 9th and 10th centuries in Baghdad. The second half of the book contains Arab-Islamic contributions to the fields of logic, philosophy, geometry, the development of Ptolemaic astronomy, observational methods, calculations in trigonometry and mathematics to determine the length of the year, the eccentricity of the sun's orbit, and the construction of astronomical tables, etc.

The Ṭabaqāt al-ʼUmam has been transcribed and translated into many different languages in many periods and cultures. The original document is not extant and discrepancies in the translations creates problems for historians, including variations in the title of the book. Discrepancies in the content of the editions appear with some versions omitting words, sentences, paragraphs or entire sections. Some omissions or variations may have arisen through scribal error, or difficulties of direct translation, while others arose, perhaps deliberately, out of the political, religious, or nationalistic sensibilities of the translators.

Notes

References

Bibliography

External links
  (PDF version)

1029 births
1070 deaths
11th-century Arabs
11th-century historians from al-Andalus
11th-century astronomers
11th-century biographers
11th-century mathematicians
Arabic-language writers
Astronomers from al-Andalus
Bibliographers
Islamic Chroniclers
Historians of science
Mathematicians from al-Andalus
Encyclopedists of the medieval Islamic world
Al-Andalus encyclopedists